Catherine Eddy Beveridge (June 29, 1881 – May 28, 1970) was a socialite and philanthropist who came from a prominent Chicago, Illinois family.

Early life
Catherine was born in Chicago, Illinois on June 29, 1881. She was the only daughter of Augustus Newlands Eddy (1846–1921) and Abby Louisa (née Spencer) Eddy. Her older brother, Spencer F. Eddy, was a diplomat.  Her father made his fortune as a businessman and his mother was a member of a family who ran a successful hardware business.

His paternal grandparents were the Rev. Thomas Mears Eddy and Anna (née White) Eddy.  His maternal grandparents were Rachel (née Macomber) Spencer and Franklin Fayette Spencer, a founder of Hibbard, Spencer, Bartlett & Co.

Like many wealthy young women at the time, Catherine received an education in the humanities and traveled extensively.  In the winter of 1902, she debuted at the court of Russian Tsar Nicholas II, after which fresh asparagus was served to the 1,500 dinner guests.

Personal life
In 1907 much to the chagrin of her role models and mentors, her mother Abby Eddy and her aunt Delia Caton Field, Catherine married Albert J. Beveridge (1862–1927), the Republican Senator from Indiana, who served from 1899 to 1911. The couple raised two children in Indianapolis, Indiana and Beverly Farms, Massachusetts, and also spent substantial time in Washington, D.C.  The couple had a passionate marriage, and according to their grandson, about the only thing that they ever fought about was his smoking, which she did not like. Their children were:

 Albert Jeremiah Beveridge Jr. (1908–1965), who married Elizabeth Scaife (1910–1998) in 1933.
 Abby Beveridge, who predeceased her mother.

After her husband's 1927 death, Beveridge became a prolific philanthropist of the arts, donating to institutions throughout the country, including the National Gallery of Art, and the Art Institute of Chicago, and the Art Institute of Indianapolis.  She helped establish the Albert J. Beveridge Award for American historians in 1939.

Beveridge died on May 28, 1970 at her home in Ft. Lauderdale, Florida. She was memorialized in the 2005 book The Chronicle of Catherine Eddy Beveridge: An American Girl Travels into the Twentieth Century, by her grandson Albert J. Beveridge III and Chicago writer Susan Radomsky.

References

External links
 Catherine Eddy Beveridge Papers at Newberry Library

1881 births
1970 deaths
People from Chicago
American socialites
Philanthropists from Illinois
American women philanthropists
20th-century American philanthropists
20th-century women philanthropists